Raymond O. Roussin  was the Archbishop of the Roman Catholic Archdiocese of Vancouver from 2004 to January 2009, when his resignation was accepted by Pope Benedict XVI.

Curriculum vitae
Born, Raymond Roussin, on June 17, 1939, in St. Vital, Winnipeg, Canada.

Ordination
Raymond Roussin entered the religious institute of the Society of Mary in 1961 in St. Louis, Missouri and was ordained as a priest in 1970.

Consecration
In 1995, Raymond Roussin was appointed Bishop of Gravelbourg and in 1999, Bishop of Victoria. Raymond Roussin was appointed Archbishop of Vancouver on January 10, 2004. His request for early retirement (for reasons of health since he had been suffering from depression) was accepted by Pope Benedict XVI on January 2, 2009.

He was open with his depression long before his resignation which is unusual for bishops and other high churchmen. Psychologists lauded his coming forward as heroic.

Legacy
Due to the declining Catholic population in the Diocese of Gravelbourg, Saskatchewan, Raymond Roussin was entrusted with dissolving the Diocese in 1995. On September 14, 1998, the Diocese reverted to the Archdiocese of Regina and the Diocese of Saskatoon.

In 1998, Raymond Roussin became Bishop of Victoria, British Columbia. Because earlier questionable investments left the Diocese of Victoria in financial trouble, Raymond Roussin reorganized its finances by selling off unused property and brought the situation under control.

In February 2007, Archbishop Raymond Roussin called for pornography-free mobile service. The call was for Catholics & non-Catholics to divest from Telus Mobility and to write to the Canadian Radio-television and Telecommunications Commission to stop downloading of pornography onto cell phones. Roussin's call, whose story drew the attention of The New York Times and Bloomberg News,  was key to Telus dropping its adult content offerings.

On July 7, 2008, James Wingle, Bishop of St. Catharines and Raymond Roussin, Archbishop of Vancouver, spoke out strongly against the decision to grant Dr. Henry Morgentaler the Order of Canada, and called for this award to be revoked.

On September 5, 2008, Raymond Roussin, asked for support of Bill C-484, which would help protect the unborn as victims of crime. Presently, if a pregnant woman is attacked, and her unborn child is killed, the attacker is not charged with the murder of the child.

On January 2, 2009, he was succeeded by J. Michael Miller.

On April 24, 2015, he died in Winnipeg.

Other positions
 member of Canadian Conference of Catholic Bishops (CCCB)
 member of the Episcopal Commission for Christian Education (French Sector)
 member of Episcopal Commission for Liturgy (English Sector)

References

External links
Archdiocese of Vancouver
St. Mary's University
 Archdiocese of Vancouver former bishops

1939 births
2015 deaths
21st-century Roman Catholic archbishops in Canada
Roman Catholic archbishops of Vancouver
Marianists
People from St. Vital, Winnipeg
Roman Catholic bishops of Victoria in Canada
Roman Catholic bishops of Saint Boniface